Casariche is a city located in the province of Seville, Spain. According to the 2006 census (INE), the city has a population of 5414 inhabitants.

References

External links
Casariche - Sistema de Información Multiterritorial de Andalucía

Municipalities of the Province of Seville